James Cook Ayer (May 5, 1818 – July 3, 1878) was the wealthiest patent medicine businessman of his day.

Early life
James Cook Ayer was born in Groton, Connecticut on May 5, 1818, the son of Frederick Ayer (1792-1825) and Persis Herrick Cook (1786-1880). After his mother remarried, James Ayer and his brother Frederick Ayer moved to Lowell, Massachusetts and lived with his uncle, James Cook.  

He attended Lowell High School in 1838, after which he was apprenticed to James C. Robbins, a druggist in Lowell. While there he studied medicine, and later he graduated from the medical school of the University of Pennsylvania.

Career

Ayer never practiced medicine, but devoted his principal attention to pharmaceutical chemistry and the compounding of medicines. His success in this line was very great, and soon led him to establish a factory in Lowell for the manufacture of his medicinal preparations, which became one of the largest of its kind in the world, and was magnificently equipped. He accumulated a fortune estimated at $20,000,000.

Much of his success was due to his advertising, on which he spent $140,000 a year, and he annually published an almanac, distributing 5,000,000 copies each year. Editions in English, French, German, Portuguese, and Spanish, were regularly issued. In 1874 he accepted the Republican nomination for the United States Congress in the 7th Massachusetts District, but was defeated.

In addition to his patent medicine business, Dr. Ayer was involved in textile production in Lowell, Massachusetts with his brother.

Personal life

His son, Frederick Fanning Ayer, born 1851, became a lawyer and philanthropist, and was director or stockholder of many corporations.

He died in an insane asylum on July 3, 1878 and is interred at Lowell Cemetery.

Legacy
The monument at Ayer's gravesite, a life-size marble lion sculpted by Albert Bruce-Joy, is one of the best known at Lowell Cemetery.

The town of Ayer, Mass., was named after him.

Gallery

See Also 
 Frederick Ayer Mansion

References

External links

 Article about Dr Ayer
 Myths refuted about Dr. James Cook Ayer With more information about his products and life.

American manufacturing businesspeople
Businesspeople from Massachusetts
Ayer, Massachusetts
1818 births
1878 deaths
People of the Industrial Revolution
Patent medicine businesspeople
People from Groton, Connecticut
People from Lowell, Massachusetts
Perelman School of Medicine at the University of Pennsylvania alumni
Deaths in mental institutions
19th-century American businesspeople